Yvon Petra (8 March 1916 – 12 September 1984) was a French male tennis player. He was born in Cholon, French Indochina.

Petra is best remembered as the last Frenchman to win the Wimbledon Championships men's singles title (in 1946), beating Geoff Brown in five sets in the final. In doubles, he won the French Championships twice, in 1938 with Bernard Destremau, defeating the best pair in the world Budge-Mako, and in 1946 with Marcel Bernard. In 1938, he won the singles and doubles title at the French Covered Court Championships. He was a prisoner of war in World War II and after his release won three Tournoi de France singles titles from 1943 through 1945. He emigrated to the United States and worked as a tennis pro at the Saddle and Cycle Club in Chicago and a country club in Connecticut towards the end of his life. Petra was ranked world No. 4 for 1946 by A. Wallis Myers and world No. 8 for 1947 by Harry Hopman. He was the last man to wear long trousers in a Wimbledon final and was the last Frenchman to win the singles title.

Petra joined the tour of professional players in 1948. He was inducted into International Tennis Hall of Fame in 2016.

Grand Slam finals

Singles: 1 (1 title)

Doubles: 2 (2 titles)

Mixed doubles: 3 (1 title, 2 runner-ups)

References

External links
 
 
 

1916 births
1984 deaths
French male tennis players
French people of Vietnamese descent
Grand Slam (tennis) champions in men's singles
Grand Slam (tennis) champions in mixed doubles
Grand Slam (tennis) champions in men's doubles
Professional tennis players before the Open Era
International Tennis Hall of Fame inductees
French Championships (tennis) champions
Wimbledon champions (pre-Open Era)
French prisoners of war in World War II